Ralph of Shrewsbury (died 1363) was an English medieval bishop and university chancellor.

Life
From 1328 to 1329, Ralph was Chancellor of the University of Oxford.

On 2 June 1329 Ralph was elected Bishop of Bath and Wells and consecrated on 3 September 1329. He died on 14 August 1363.

Ralph founded Vicars Close.

Notes

Citations

References

External links
Will of Ralph of Shrewsbury from Google Books

 Year of birth unknown
1369 deaths
 Bishops of Bath and Wells
14th-century English educators
Ralph of Shrewsbury
14th-century English Roman Catholic bishops
Clergy from Shrewsbury
 Burials at Wells Cathedral